DJ Kicks: Trüby Trio is a DJ mix album, mixed by Trüby Trio. It was released on 27 August 2001 on the Studio !K7 independent record label as part of the DJ-Kicks series.

Track listing
"Medley: General Science/Ish/PapaLaBas" - Conjure - 4:40
"High Jazz" - Trüby Trio - 7:01
"Find an Oasis" - Block 16 - 5:14
"Edony 'Clap Your Hands'" - Africanism ft. Hassam Ramzy - 4:07
"Scat Box" - Matthaus - 2:10
"Granada" - Slow Supreme - 4:37
"Upsolid" - Sequel - 6:03
"Transcend Me" - Afronaught - 7:13
"Some People (Waiwan Remix)" - Korova - 5:06
"One and the Same (Jazztronik Brushed Up Mix)" - Modaji - 5:45
"Colours (Freeform Five Remix)" - Tim Hutton - 7:06
"Ginger & Fred" - Voom:Voom - 6:25
"Galicia (Zero Db Remix)" - Trüby Trio - 5:18
"Toronto" - Lehner & Biebl - 3:45
"Tel Aviv" - Fauna Flash - 4:05

References

External links 
DJ-Kicks website

Truby Trio
2001 remix albums
2001 compilation albums